Barmal District is a district of Paktika Province, Afghanistan. It shares a border with Khyber Pakhtunkhwa and Balochistan, Pakistan. The Angur Ada is the official border checkpoint and border crossing between the people of Paktika and Khyber Pakhtunkhwa. The government office of Barmal District is located in Newai Ada.

History
Barmal was one of the districts most affected by the 2022 Afghanistan earthquake, which killed at least 500 persons and injured a thousand others in the district. Many houses constructed primarily of mud and wood were razed to the ground. Heavy rain and the earthquake contributed to landslides that destroyed entire hamlets.

Construction of new earthquake-resistant houses

In August 2022, new "earthquake-resistant houses" began to be constructed in the district for victims of the earthquake. The project involves the establishment of 2,000 homes in both Gayan and Barmal districts of Paktika Province, including 300 houses in Spera District of neighboring Khost Province.

Geography

Major towns of Barmal District are:
 Newai Ada
 Margha Ada
 Laman Ada
 Gajikhel Ada
 Zargar Ada
 Titoon Shaga

Demographics 

The population of the district in 2004 was 88,028 people. Majority of them are ethnic Pashtuns, mainly from the Wazir and Kharoti tribes.

References

https://www.afghanistan-analysts.org/en/reports/context-culture/the-1919-war-of-independence-or-third-anglo-afghan-war-a-conflict-the-afghans-started-and-ended/

Districts of Paktika Province
Paktika Province